The B. B. Comer Bridge, was a two-lane,  long, Warren truss bridge spanning the Tennessee River along Alabama State Route 35 in Scottsboro, Alabama. The bridge was named after Alabama governor Braxton Bragg Comer, who served from 1907 to 1911. Construction of the bridge was carried out by the Kansas City Bridge Company for the Alabama State Bridge Corporation.  Its construction commenced in 1929 and was complete by 1931. As of 2013, this was the only remaining bridge of the 15 memorial toll bridges constructed by the Alabama State Bridge Corporation.

By 2007, the aging structure was classified by the Alabama Department of Transportation as being a structurally deficient bridge with an overall rating of 7.7 out of 100. Construction of a replacement bridge commenced in October 2007, and is expected to be completed in late 2015. As of April 2016, the replacement is several months away from completion. The Comer Bridge was scheduled to be demolished in 2015 although preservation efforts are underway and the Comer Bridge Foundation has been organized. In April 2013, the bridge was named one of the top ten "Top Rated Unique Savable Structures" by BridgeHunter.com.  On October 31, 2013, the B. B. Comer Bridge was added to the Alabama Register of Landmarks and Heritage. On April 29, 2016, the bridge closed to all traffic with the opening of the new bridge. Crews began removing the road deck immediately after closure. Demolition of the original span began June, 2016 and was completed in July.  A pyramid shaped sculpture built from the steel of the north entrance of the bridge was installed at Scottsboro High School in May 2018 as a monument to the bridge.

See also
 List of crossings of the Tennessee River

References 

Bridges completed in 1931
Road bridges in Alabama
Bridges over the Tennessee River
Transportation buildings and structures in Jackson County, Alabama
Former toll bridges in Alabama
Steel bridges in the United States
Warren truss bridges in the United States